Johann George Pfaltzgraff or Pfaltzgraf (May 5, 1808 – January 7, 1873) was a German-American potter and businessman. He is recognized as the first potter in the Pfaltzgraff family of potters in the United States.  Pfaltzgraff Pottery Co. is known as the oldest pottery company in the USA. Lifetime Brands purchased the business in 2005.

Born in Frielendorf, Germany, he moved to Foustown in York County, Pennsylvania, United States in 1833.  He arrived with his wife Hedwig Eleonore (Elenora) Bramer right after they were married on May 27, 1833, in Frielendorf.  Elenora was a commoner by German standards while Johann came from a family of great distinction and the upper class, as his family owned a pottery company.  The marriage was frowned upon by his family in Germany, so Johann decided that a move to the United States was in the best interests of himself and Elenora. Johann and Elenora had ten children: John Bramer, George Bramer, Elizabeth, Emma, Annie, Sarah, Lydia, Cornelius, Henry, and Isaac.

After they settled into the Foustown community, Johann began his new life as a farmer. He also started his trade that he mastered while in Germany by designing and creating his own pottery.  He almost immediately began making stoneware from clay that he would purchase from Ohio. He also used the local lands in the Foustown area to gather his own clays as this region of Pennsylvania is rich in clays. Later, at least three of his sons learned the trade from him. There were: John Bramer, George Bramer, and Cornelius.  The oldest pieces known to exist from the family are from John Bramer Pfaltzgraff.  And every one of his pieces were unique, in that he never created a duplicate piece of pottery.

Johann George died January 7, 1873. He is buried in the Loucks Cemetery (also known as Wolf's) across the street from the West Manchester Mall at 1881 Loucks Rd, York, Pennsylvania.  Elenora died on January 8, 1896, and is buried in the same cemetery.  Other Pfaltzgraff family members are buried in Prospect Hill Cemetery in York.

References 
Ethel Jennings Bergdoll transcripts, Johannes Schwalm Historical Association; Member Pennsylvania Federation of Historical Societies 
Katherine Pfaltzgraff Masimore of York, Pennsylvania
Pfaltzgraff archives, York, Pennsylvania

1808 births
1873 deaths
American potters
American company founders
German emigrants to the United States
People from Schwalm-Eder-Kreis
19th-century American businesspeople
Businesspeople from Pennsylvania
People from York County, Pennsylvania
Burials in Pennsylvania